All the Beauty in This Whole Life is the sixth studio album by Brother Ali. It was released on Rhymesayers Entertainment on May 5, 2017. It is Brother Ali's first album in five years. Entirely produced by Ant, it features guest appearances from Amir Sulaiman, Dem Atlas, Sa-Roc, and Idris Phillips.

It includes "Pray for Me", a track inspired by Brother Ali's experience with albinism, and "Out of Here", which references the suicides of his father and grandfather.

Track listing

Charts

References

External links
 

2017 albums
Brother Ali albums
Rhymesayers Entertainment albums
Albums produced by Ant (producer)